Our Lady of Perpetual Help Church, or variations with Parish or Catholic or otherwise, may refer to:

United States
 Basilica and Shrine of Our Lady of Perpetual Help, Boston, Massachusetts
 Basilica of Our Lady of Perpetual Help (Brooklyn), Brooklyn, New York
 Cathedral of Our Lady of Perpetual Help (Oklahoma_City)
 Our Lady of Perpetual Help Church (Altus, Arkansas)
 Our Lady of Perpetual Help Parish (Quaker Hill, Connecticut) 
 Our Lady of Perpetual Help Parish (Glenview, IL)
 Our Lady of Perpetual Help Parish (New Bedford, Massachusetts)
 Saint Mary of Perpetual Help Church (Chicago, Illinois)

Other
 Our Lady of Perpetual Help Catholic Church, London, United Kingdom
 Our Lady of Perpetual Help Church, Petrozavodsk, Russia

See also
Cathedral of Our Lady of Perpetual Help (disambiguation)